Mickey Dean is an American softball coach who is the current head coach at Auburn.

Early life and education
Dean graduated from Elon University in 1987. Dean pitched for the Phoenix baseball team and was a four-year letter winner.

Coaching career

Radford

James Madison

Auburn
On September 14, 2017, Mickey Dean was announced as the new head coach of the Auburn Softball program, replacing Clint Myers who resigned in August 2017, amid accusations against him and his assistants.

Personal life
Dean is married to his wife Liz, and they have two adult children.

Head coaching record

College
References:

References 

Living people
American softball coaches
Elon Phoenix baseball players
Akron Zips softball coaches
Indiana Hoosiers softball coaches
Longwood Lancers softball coaches
Radford Highlanders softball coaches
James Madison Dukes softball coaches
Auburn Tigers softball coaches
1965 births